Zafarabad (also Romanized as Z̧afarābād) is a village in Sarab Rural District, Giyan District, Nahavand County, Hamadan Province, Iran. At the 2006 census, its population was 643, in 149 families.

References 

Populated places in Nahavand County